Greatest Hits is the first Greatest Hits compilation to be released by American country music artist John Michael Montgomery; it was released in 1997 on Atlantic Records. The track "Angel in My Eyes" was newly recorded for this compilation and released as a single, peaking at #4 on the Billboard country music charts in 1998.

In August 1999 the album was certified Platinum by the RIAA.

Track listing

Personnel on track 13
 Bruce Bouton - steel guitar
 Mike Brignardello - bass guitar
 Shannon Forrest - drums
 Larry Franklin - fiddle
 Dann Huff - electric guitar
 John Michael Montgomery - acoustic guitar, lead vocals
 Steve Nathan - piano
 Michael Spriggs - acoustic guitar
 Bobby Terry - electric guitar
 Curtis Young - background vocals

Chart performance

Weekly charts

Year-end charts

Certifications

References

1997 greatest hits albums
John Michael Montgomery albums
Atlantic Records compilation albums